The Public Order Act 1986 (c 64) is an Act of the Parliament of the United Kingdom. It creates a number of public order offences. They replace similar common law offences and parts of the Public Order Act 1936. It implements recommendations of the Law Commission.

Background 
Before the introduction of the Public Order Act 1986, policing public order was based on various relevant common law offences, and the Public Order Act 1936. Several factors influenced the introduction of the Public Order Act 1986. Significant public disorder, such as the Southall riot in 1979, the Brixton riot that extended to other cities in 1981, and the national miner's strike and associated disorder between 1984 and 1985 – in particular the Battle of Orgreave in June 1984 – and the Battle of the Beanfield in June 1985. Furthermore, the 1983 Law Commission report, Criminal Law: Offences Relating to Public Order recommended updating the law.

The Law Commission stated its desire to further to extend the codification of the law in England and Wales. It advocated the abolition of the common law offences of affray, riot, rout, and unlawful assembly.  It argued the changes it recommended to public order legislation made it more practical to use, and make the law more comprehensible to the courts and juries.

The long title of the Act details the intention of the Public Order Act 1986:

Offences

Part 1 – New offences
Section 1 – Riot

Section 2 – Violent disorder

Section 3 – Affray

Section 4 – Fear or provocation of violence

Section 4A – Intentional harassment, alarm or distress added by section 154 of the Criminal Justice and Public Order Act 1994

Section 5 – Harassment, alarm or distress

Section 8 – Interpretation
This section defines the words "dwelling" and "violence".

Section 9 – Offences abolished
Section 9(1) abolished the common law offences of riot, rout, unlawful assembly and affray.

Section 9(2) abolished the offences under:
section 1 of the Tumultuous Petitioning Act 1661
section 1 of the Shipping Offences Act 1793
section 23 of the Seditious Meetings Act 1817
section 5 of the Public Order Act 1936

Part 2 – Processions and assemblies
Section 11 – Advance notice of public processions requires at least six clear days' written notice to be given to the police before most public processions, including details of the intended time and route, and giving the name and address of at least one person proposing to organise it; creates offences for the organisers of a procession if they do not give sufficient notice, or if the procession diverges from the notified time or route

Section 12 – Imposing conditions on public processions provides police the power to impose conditions on processions "to prevent serious public disorder, serious criminal damage or serious disruption to the life of the community"

Section 13 – Prohibiting public processions a chief police officer has the power to ban public processions up to three months by applying to local authority for a banning order which needs subsequent confirmation from the Home Secretary.

Section 14 – Imposing conditions on public assemblies provides police the power to impose conditions on assemblies "to prevent serious public disorder, serious criminal damage or serious disruption to the life of the community". The conditions are limited to the specifying of:
 the number of people who may take part,
 the location of the assembly, and
 its maximum duration.

Section 14A – Prohibiting trespassory assemblies added by section 70 of the Criminal Justice and Public Order Act 1994, to control "raves"

Section 16 – Public assembly Originally meant an assembly of 20 or more persons in a public place which is wholly or partly open to the air. The Anti-Social Behaviour Act 2003 amended the act to reduce the minimum numbers of people in an assembly to two, and removed the requirement to be in the open air.

Parts 3 and 3A – Racial and religious hatred
If the act is intended to stir up racial hatred Part 3 of the Act creates offences of
 use of words or behaviour or display of written material (section 18),
 publishing or distributing written material (section 19),
 public performance of a play (section 20),
 distributing, showing or playing a recording (section 21),
 broadcasting (section 22). or
 possession of racially inflammatory material (section 23)

Acts intended to stir up religious hatred are proscribed in POA Part 3A by the Racial and Religious Hatred Act 2006 (RRHA) with the insertion of new sections 29A to 29N. The RRHA bill, which was introduced by Home Secretary David Blunkett, was amended several times in the House of Lords and ultimately the Blair government was forced to accept the substitute words.

To stir up hatred on the grounds of sexual orientation was to be proscribed by the Criminal Justice and Immigration Act 2008 in POA Part 3A section 29AB. This legislation was introduced by David Hanson MP.

The Act and Article 11 of ECHR

The Act should be considered in connection with Article 11 of European Convention on Human Rights, which grants people the rights of (peaceful) assembly and freedom of association with others.

Controversies

Misuse of section 14
The police have been accused by protestors and journalists of misusing the powers in section 14 on several occasions. During the 2009 G-20 London summit protests journalists were forced to leave the protests by police who threatened them with arrest.

The campaign to reform section 5
The "Reform Section 5" campaign was established in May 2012 to garner support for an alteration of section 5, and led to an increase in the threshold from "abusive or insulting" to strictly "abusive" for speech restricted by the act. It was reported that under section 5 alone, 51,285 people were convicted between 2001 and 2003, 8,489 of whom were between 10 and 17 years of age.

The campaign was supported by a range of groups and famous individuals. These included the National Secular Society, the Christian Institute, the Bow Group, Big Brother Watch, the Peter Tatchell Foundation and The Freedom Association. Actors Rowan Atkinson and Stephen Fry also voiced their support.

In 2013, a House of Lords amendment to a forthcoming Crime and Court Bill meant the removal of "insulting" from the definition of section 5 of the Public Order Act 1986. A subsequent House of Commons briefing paper acknowledged the government's acceptance of the amendment and detailed the reasons for its decision.

Proposed amendments
In 2021 the government published the Police, Crime, Sentencing and Courts Bill which would amend and strengthen the Public Order Act 1986 in certain ways, including widening the restrictions police can place on protests and demonstrations, impose conditions on one-person protests, and define what is meant by protests causing "serious disruption" to wider communities.

See also
Public Order Act

Riot Act
Public Order Bill

References

External links

The Crown Prosecution Service Charging Standards for Public Order Offences
The Public Order Act 1986, as amended, from the National Archives.

English legal terminology
United Kingdom Acts of Parliament 1986
English criminal law
Hate crime
Religious discrimination in the United Kingdom